Chandragudem is a village in NTR district of the Indian state of Andhra Pradesh. It is located in Nandigama mandal of Vijayawada revenue division. It is one of the villages in the mandal to be a part of Andhra Pradesh Capital Region.

References

Villages in NTR district
Villages in Andhra Pradesh Capital Region